The 2012 Brussels Open was a women's tennis tournament played on outdoor clay courts. It was the 2nd edition of the Brussels Open, and was part of the Premier-level tournaments of the 2012 WTA Tour. The event took place at the Royal Primerose Tennis Club in Brussels, Belgium, from May 19 through May 26, 2012. Agnieszka Radwańska won the singles title.

Champions

Singles

 Agnieszka Radwańska  defeated  Simona Halep 7–5, 6–0
It was Radwanska's 3rd title of the year and 10th of her career. It was her 3rd Premier-level tournament of her career and 6th Premier overall.

Doubles

 Bethanie Mattek-Sands /  Sania Mirza defeated  Alicja Rosolska /  Zheng Jie 6–3, 6–2

Singles main draw entrants

Seeds

Rankings as of May 14, 2012

Other entrants
The following players received wildcards into the main draw:
  Tamaryn Hendler
  Jelena Janković
  Alison van Uytvanck

The following players received entry from the qualifying draw:
  Irina Falconi
  Sania Mirza
  Urszula Radwańska
  Arantxa Rus

The following players received entry as lucky losers:
  Bojana Jovanovski 
  Lesia Tsurenko

Withdrawals
  Sara Errani 
  Daniela Hantuchová (foot stress fracture)
  Angelique Kerber (low back injury)
  Andrea Petkovic (ankle ligaments injury)
  Roberta Vinci (right wrist injury)

Retirements
  Arantxa Rus

Doubles main draw entrants

Seeds

1 Rankings are as of May 14, 2012

Other entrants
The following pair received wildcard into the doubles main draw:
  Elena Bovina /  Alison Van Uytvanck
The following pair received entry as alternates:
  Veronika Kapshay /  Lenka Wienerová

Withdrawals
  Ksenia Pervak (knee injury)

References

External links
 Official website

Brussels Open
Brussels Open
2010s in Brussels
May 2012 sports events in Europe